Robert George Emmerich (August 1, 1891 – November 22, 1948) is a former Major League Baseball player. He played one season with the Boston Braves.

References

External links

Boston Braves players
Major League Baseball outfielders
Bridgeport Americans players
Worcester Panthers players
Albany Senators players
Bridgeport Bears (baseball) players
Pittsfield Hillies players
Baseball players from New York City
1891 births
1948 deaths